Madhan, real name Maadapoosi Krishnaswamy Govindan' (born 11 July 1947 in Srirangam), is a Tamil cartoonist, journalist, writer and film critic. He previously worked for the weekly magazine Ananda Vikatan and is currently hosting a film review show Madhan Movie Matinee in PudhuYugam TV.
 
He was one of the juries for the TV program Naalaya Iyakunar, Season 1.

In 2016, he was the presenter of the Tamil supernatural investigation television series Manithanum Marmangalum.

Madhan resides in Chennai, Tamil Nadu.

Works 
The works are not listed in chronological order.

 1. Manithanum Marmangalum
 2. Vanthargal Vendrargal
 3. Manithanukulle Oru Mirugam
 4. KiMu KiPi
 5. Hai Madhan
 6. Kadhal Vazhga

See also
 List of Indian writers

References

External links
 Madan's Thirai Paarvai

Indian cartoonists
1947 births
Living people
Writers from Tiruchirappalli